Tuckerization (or tuckerism) is the act of using a person's name (and sometimes other characteristics) in an original story as an in-joke. The term is derived from Wilson Tucker, a pioneering American science fiction writer, fan and fanzine editor, who made a practice of using his friends' names for minor characters in his stories. For example, Tucker named a character after Lee Hoffman in his novel The Long Loud Silence, and after Walt Willis in Wild Talent.

In most cases, tuckerization is used for "bit parts" (minor characters), an opportunity for the author to create an homage to a friend or respected colleague. However, an author sometimes attaches a friend's name, description, or identifiable characteristics to a major character, and in some novels, nearly all characters represent friends, colleagues, or prominent persons the author knows. When that happens, tuckerization can rise to the level of a roman à clef.

Tuckerization is generally for wink-and-nod homages: characters with suspiciously similar names or features. It should not be confused with the direct inclusion of real people in fiction, a form of story that is usually called biographical fiction when it is the main focus.

Notable examples 
H. P. Lovecraft's acquaintance Robert Bloch published "The Shambler from the Stars", in the September 1935 Weird Tales; its unnamed, doomed protagonist is a weird-fiction author closely resembling Lovecraft. As a genial return, Lovecraft's "The Haunter of the Dark", published in the December 1936 Weird Tales, introduces Robert Harrison Blake, who shares Bloch's Milwaukee street address and is killed off in an equally horrible fashion. Bloch wrote a third story after Lovecraft's death, "The Shadow from the Steeple" (1950), in which the events of the first two stories are further explored.

Evelyn Waugh featured absurd, preposterous or dishonest characters named Cruttwell, after C. R. M. F. Cruttwell, the dean of Hertford College when Waugh was a student and Waugh's tutor, who tried to get Waugh to fulfil the conditions of his scholarship and study. It was only after Cruttwell suffered a mental breakdown in 1939 and his death in 1941 that his name disappeared from Waugh's works. In his novels up to The Anti-Death League, Kingsley Amis
featured characters named Caton, after R.A. Caton of the Fortune Press, who published Amis's first book of poems, Bright November, but did not promote it properly, in Amis's view. More mercifully than Waugh, in The Anti-Death League, Caton dies and his name disappears from Amis's work.

Harry Harrison's To the Stars character: "Old Lundwall, who commands the Sverige, should have retired a decade ago, but he is still the best there is." Sam J Lundwall is a well-known Swedish science fiction publisher and writer, as well as the godfather of Harrison's daughter, and Sverige is the Swedish word for Sweden.

A tuckerization can also be the use of a person's character or personal attributes with a new name as an in-joke, such as Ian Arnstein in S. M. Stirling's Island in the Sea of Time trilogy, clearly modeled on his good friend Harry Turtledove, albeit an alternate history Turtledove.

Mary Jane, after whom Buster Brown's sweetheart from the Mary Jane shoe style was named, was inspired by Richard Felton Outcault's daughter of the same name. In Outcault's and his daughter's own words, she was the only character drawn from life in the Buster Brown strip although "she resembled Outcault's wife.

Larry Niven and Jerry Pournelle have written works in which nearly all the characters represent people the authors know. In Inferno, about half the people the main character meets are famous people, and in Fallen Angels, nearly everybody who assists the effort to return the "angels" (astronauts) to orbit is either a well-known fan (Jenny Trout = filksinger, author, and political activist Leslie Fish), a friend of Niven & Pournelle (Dan Forrester = Dan Alderson), or somebody who paid (through donation to a fan charity) for the privilege of appearing in the book. In this case, the first and second categories are not true tuckerizations, since the individual's real names are not used (however recognizable many of them may be).

A similar effect is seen in Niven's collaboration with David Gerrold, The Flying Sorcerers; all the gods are well known science fiction or media personalities (Ouells = H. G. Wells, Rotn'bair = Star Trek creator Gene Roddenberry, etc.).

In the early 1930s, before Jerry Siegel and Joe Shuster created the comic-book superhero Superman, they had written and illustrated a fanzine story, "The Reign of the Superman", featuring a super-powered villain. The story includes one of the first tuckerizations: a character named after Forrest J Ackerman.

More recent examples include the many science fiction and military novelists whose names are borrowed in the Axis of Time by John Birmingham, and the Lachlan Fox thriller series by James Clancy Phelan.  Philip K. Dick employed tuckerization in his short story "Waterspider", in which he sent fellow author Poul Anderson ahead in time to a future where science fiction authors were seen as having precognitive abilities.  Fiona Kelleghan, a science fiction critic, has been tuckerized a few times by authors whom she wrote about: in Corrupting Dr. Nice by John Kessel, in Galveston by Sean Stewart, in Run by Douglas E. Winter, twice in the WWW Trilogy by Robert J. Sawyer (once as a character under her maiden name, "Feehan", and once as her real-world self), and in Spondulix by Paul Di Filippo.

The British science fiction writer Simon R. Green repeatedly tuckerizes Ansible editor David Langford by killing him off in various grisly ways and then gleefully notifying Ansible about the latest killing. Similarly, the science fiction fan Joe Buckley, who maintains a website dedicated to detailing information about the publications of Baen Books, has been tuckerized in books by a number of Baen authors, including Eric Flint and David Weber, dying a variety of unpleasant deaths. Weber has also tuckerized various other fans and authors, including Flint, Timothy Zahn, and Jordin Kare, even crewing one small spacecraft with a collection of hearts-playing Chattanooga-based science fiction fans.

One notable example of Tuckerization outside the world of science fiction is the 1997 film Good Will Hunting. The female lead of the film is named Skylar in honor of the co-writer and star Matt Damon's college girlfriend, Skylar Satenstein (who later married the Metallica drummer Lars Ulrich).

In the world of animation, Matt Groening named the members of the Simpson family (apart than Bart) after his own parents and sisters. Similarly, South Park creators Trey Parker and Matt Stone named Randy and Sharon Marsh and Gerald and Sheila Broflovski after their own parents and Liane Cartman after Parker’s ex-fiancee Lianne Adamo. Parker had also used the name “Liane” for Alferd Packer’s unfaithful horse in his student film Cannibal! The Musical.

Legacy 

Many science fiction authors auction off tuckerizations at science fiction conventions with the proceeds going to charity.

References

External links 
 

In-jokes
Narrative techniques
Science fiction culture